Florentio Maschera (c. 1541–1584) was an Italian composer and organist of Brescia Cathedral, known for his organ pieces.

References

1540s births
1584 deaths
Year of birth uncertain
16th-century Italian composers
People from Brescia